Salome Creek is a watercourse in the Salome Wilderness in central Arizona, United States.

Natural history
The oldest exposed rock forms in the watershed are graphic granite, which dates to 1400 million years before present. The watershed holds a diverse flora and fauna. Within this part of the Sierra Ancha range there are notable disjunctive populations of Coastal woodfern, Dryopteris arguta; this fern is otherwise common in areas nearer the Pacific coast.

See also
 Workman Creek

References

Citations
 Ivo Lucchitta. 2001. Hiking Arizona's Geology, Published by The Mountaineers Books, 
 Tom Dollar and Jerry Sieve. 1999. Guide to Arizona's Wilderness Areas, Big Earth Publishing, 
 C. Michael Hogan. 2008. Coastal Woodfern (Dryopteris arguta), GlobalTwitcher, ed. N. Stromberg

External links
  – 

Rivers of Gila County, Arizona
Rivers of Arizona